Sunil Chandra Tirkey is an Indian politician and was the Minister of State for Consumer Affairs in the Government of West Bengal. He is also an MLA, elected from the Phansidewa constituency in the 2011 West Bengal state assembly election.

He resigned from the ministry when Congress withdrew its support to the Mamata Banerjee government in September 2012.

References 

State cabinet ministers of West Bengal
Indian National Congress politicians
Living people
Year of birth missing (living people)
West Bengal MLAs 2016–2021